William Worfton (c. 1366 – 1408), of Broad Hinton, Wiltshire, was an English politician.

He was a Member (MP) of the Parliament of England for Wiltshire in October 1404.

References

1366 births
1408 deaths
English MPs October 1404
People from Wiltshire